Sarah Elizabeth Robles (born August 1, 1988) is an American weightlifter. She qualified for the 2012 Summer Olympics in London and earned a bronze medal in weightlifting at the 2016 Summer Olympics in Rio de Janeiro, becoming the first US athlete to medal in Olympic weightlifting in 16 years. She repeated her feat in the +87 kg category at the 2020 Olympic Games in Tokyo, once again earning bronze, and becoming the first US woman to earn two Olympic weightlifting medals.

Career
Growing up in Desert Hot Springs, California, Robles competed in throwing events at San Jacinto High School in San Jacinto, California. Top-ranked in shot put, she earned scholarships to the University of Alabama and Arizona State University. As part of her shot put training at a local Arizona gym under coach Joe Micela, she began doing Olympic-style lifts in 2008. That same year, after only three months of weightlifting, Robles qualified for nationals and stopped competing in shot put, losing her scholarship in the process.

Competition
Robles won the silver medal at a 2010 Pan American competition and became a three time national champion.

At the 2011 World Championships, she finished in eleventh place in her weight class but first place among American women weightlifters. Robles qualified as one of two American women to compete in the 2012 Summer Olympics in London.

2012 Summer Olympics
Despite being the highest-ranked weightlifter in the United States, Robles lived on less than $400 a month leading up to the 2012 Summer Olympics in London. Commentators have suggested that this was the result both of the lack of popular attention to the sport of weightlifting, as well as Robles and other women in the sport having larger body types than those of women athletes traditionally portrayed in mass media. Robles has been quoted as saying that, "You can get that sponsorship if you're a super-built guy or a girl who looks good in a bikini. But not if you're a girl who's built like a guy."  As of July 16, 2012, a company called Solve Media was Robles's sponsor.

Doping controversy
On June 29, 2013, Robles failed a test for "DHEA, testosterone, and pregnanediol", and on August 8, 2013 was sanctioned by the International Weightlifting Federation. and the United States Anti-Doping Agency, which cited the discovery as "the presence of an exogenous androgenic anabolic steroid and/or its metabolites", removing her from competition for two years.

Robles disputed the doping accusation, asserting that treatment for Polycystic ovary syndrome (PCOS) using Dehydroepiandrosterone (DHEA) was advised by her physician. 
 
She did not seek a therapeutic use exemption (TUE) prior. Joe Micela, Robles's coach, stated that he did not approve of the DHEA use, calling it a "stupid decision", though he did not think it impacted Robles's performance. Robles's appeal of the suspension for medical reasons was denied.

2016 Summer Olympics
She was the first athlete from the United States to win a medal in Olympic weightlifting since the 2000 Summer Olympics.

2020 Summer Olympics
Robles represented the United States at the 2020 Summer Olympics in Tokyo, Japan, earning bronze. Competing in the women's +87 kg event on August 2, 2021, Robles lifted  in the snatch.

2022
She won the gold medal in the women's +87kg event at the 2022 Pan American Weightlifting Championships held in Bogotá, Colombia. She also won the gold medals in the snatch and clean & jerk events in this competition.

Health
Robles has a deformity in her arm known as Madelung's deformity, which results in a radius that is shorter than normal and bowed. The deformity leads to significant pain during lifts, and Robles treats the pain with wrist wraps and warming creams.

Robles lives with Polycystic ovary syndrome (PCOS), which typically disrupts reproductive functions and metabolism.

Personal life
Robles is a member of the Church of Jesus Christ of Latter-day Saints and is of Mexican ancestry.

External links
SarahLiftsHeavy.com
Official Biography Page
NBC Olympics: "Who is ... Sarah Robles"
NBC Olympics Biography Page

References

1988 births
Living people
Weightlifters at the 2012 Summer Olympics
Weightlifters at the 2016 Summer Olympics
Weightlifters at the 2020 Summer Olympics
Weightlifters at the 2011 Pan American Games
American Latter Day Saints
Doping cases in weightlifting
American female weightlifters
American people of Mexican descent
Olympic bronze medalists for the United States in weightlifting
Medalists at the 2016 Summer Olympics
Medalists at the 2020 Summer Olympics
World Weightlifting Championships medalists
People from Desert Hot Springs, California
Pan American Games medalists in weightlifting
Pan American Games gold medalists for the United States
Weightlifters at the 2019 Pan American Games
Medalists at the 2019 Pan American Games
Pan American Weightlifting Championships medalists
21st-century American women